"Can't Breathe" is a song by Canadian singer-songwriter Fefe Dobson from her second released studio album, Joy (2010), which features a guitar solo from Australian musician Orianthi. It was written and produced by Bob Ezrin and Tommy Henriksen, and co-written by Dobson and Thomas "Tawgs" Salter. The song was released in March 2011 as the album's third and final single, and was only released in Canada. Dobson reported on her Twitter in April of that year that the song had been sent to radio.

Music video
The music video was released on March 29, 2011 via Vevo.

Personnel
Songwriting – F. Dobson, B. Ezrin, T. "Tawgs" Salter, T. Henriksen
Production – Bob Ezrin, Tommy Henriksen
Mixing – Serban Ghenea
Mix engineer – John Hanes (Assisted by Tim Roberts)
Programming, keyboards, strings, bass and electric guitars: Tommy Henriksen
Keyboards and additional programming: Bob Ezrin, Thomas "Tawgs" Salter and Tim Lauer
Lead guitar: Steve Hunter
Guitar solo: Orianthi
Backing vocals: Vicki Hampton and Fefe Dobson

Source:

Charts

Year-end charts

Certifications

References

2010 songs
2011 singles
Fefe Dobson songs
Island Records singles
Music videos directed by Aaron A
Orianthi songs
Song recordings produced by Bob Ezrin
Songs written by Bob Ezrin
Songs written by Fefe Dobson
Songs written by Tawgs Salter
Songs written by Tommy Henriksen